Dasychalina is a genus of sponges in the family Niphatidae.

Species
 Dasychalina fragilis Ridley & Dendy, 1886
 Dasychalina magellanica (Thiele, 1905)
 Dasychalina melior Ridley & Dendy, 1886
 Dasychalina validissima (Thiele, 1905)

References 

Sponge genera
Haplosclerida
Taxa named by Arthur Dendy
Taxa named by Stuart Oliver Ridley